Sylvie Andrieux (born 15 December 1961, in Marseille) was a member of the National Assembly of France.  She represented the department of Bouches-du-Rhône, from 1997 to 2016 and sat initially as a member of Socialiste, radical, citoyen et divers gauche. She is implicated in the scandal of misappropriation of the Conseil régional de Provence-Alpes-Côte d'Azur subventions

She was a member of Le Droit Humain until she resigned in 2012.

In May 2013, having been convicted of misappropriation of public funds, she was excluded from the Socialist Party, and thenceforth sat as an independent in the National Assembly.
In November 2016, she was finally sentenced to one year's imprisonment and a three-year suspended prison term.

References

External links
Webpage at the National Assembly
Sylvie Andrieux's politics blog

1961 births
Living people
Politicians from Marseille
Socialist Party (France) politicians
Women members of the National Assembly (France)
Deputies of the 11th National Assembly of the French Fifth Republic
Deputies of the 12th National Assembly of the French Fifth Republic
Deputies of the 13th National Assembly of the French Fifth Republic
Deputies of the 14th National Assembly of the French Fifth Republic
21st-century French women politicians
20th-century French women politicians